Ruleta de la Muerte (1999) was a professional wrestling pay-per-view event produced by Consejo Mundial de Lucha Libre (CMLL) that took place on July 18, 1999 in Palacio de los Deportes, Mexico City, Mexico. The show featured the Ruleta de la Muerte¨(Spanish for "Roulette of Death") tournament, in which tag teams face off in a single elimination tournament, but unlike traditional tournaments it is the losing team that advances in the tournament. The losing team in the final match must wrestle each other in a Lucha de Apuestas match, where either their mask or their hair is on the line. The Tournament featured 8 teams, all of them randomly paired the tournament through the elimination order of a battle royal involving all 16 participants. In addition to the battle royal, seven tournament matches and the Lucha de Apuesta match the show also featured two five vs. five elimination matches on the under card.

Background
The event featured 11 professional wrestling matches with different wrestlers involved in pre-existing scripted feuds or storylines. Wrestlers portray either villains (referred to as Rudos in Mexico) or fan favorites (Técnicos in Mexico) as they compete in wrestling matches with pre-determined outcomes.

Results

References

1999 in professional wrestling
Consejo Mundial de Lucha Libre shows
Events in Mexico City